The 1954 Brown Bears football team was an American football team that represented Brown University as an independent during the 1954 college football season. 

In their fourth season under head coach Alva Kelley, the Bears compiled a 3–5–1 record, but outscored their opponents 225 to 120. E. Pearson was the team captain.  

Brown played its home games at Brown Stadium in Providence, Rhode Island.

Schedule

References

Brown
Brown Bears football seasons
Brown Bears football